Khaneh Khal may refer to:
 Khaneh Khal-e Olya
 Khaneh Khal-e Sofla